Daniel Leonard Everett (born 26 July 1951) is an American linguist and author best known for his study of the Amazon basin's Pirahã people and their language.

Everett is currently Trustee Professor of Cognitive Sciences at Bentley University in Waltham, Massachusetts. From July 1, 2010 to June 30, 2018, Everett served as Dean of Arts and Sciences at Bentley. Prior to Bentley University, Everett was chair of the Department of Languages, Literatures and Cultures at Illinois State University in Normal, Illinois. He has taught at the University of Manchester and the University of Campinas and is former chair of the Linguistics Department of the University of Pittsburgh.

Early life 

Everett was raised near the Mexican border in Holtville, California. His father was an occasional cowboy, mechanic, and construction worker. His mother was a waitress at a local restaurant. Everett played in rock bands from the time he was 11 years old until converting to Christianity at age 17, after meeting missionaries Al and Sue Graham in San Diego, California.

At age 18, Everett married the daughter of these missionaries, Keren. He completed a diploma in Foreign Missions from the Moody Bible Institute of Chicago in 1975. Daniel and Keren Everett subsequently enrolled in the Summer Institute of Linguistics (now SIL International), which trains missionaries in field linguistics so that they can translate the Bible into various world languages.

Because Everett, by his own account, quickly demonstrated a gift for language, he was invited to study Pirahã, which previous SIL missionaries had, according to Everett, failed to learn in 20 years of study. In 1977, after four months of jungle training and three semesters of courses in linguistic analysis, translation principles, and literacy development, the couple and their three children moved to Brazil, where they studied Portuguese for a year before moving to a Pirahã village at the mouth of the Maici River in the Lowland Amazonia region. Since 1999, Everett's stays in the jungle have notoriously included a generator-powered freezer, and a large video and DVD collection. Says Everett, "After twenty years of living like a Pirahã, I’d had it with roughing it."

Everett's first marriage to Keren Graham lasted 35 years and they had three children: Caleb Everett (associate professor of anthropology, University of Miami); Kristene Diggins (a doctor of nursing practice in Charlotte, North Carolina); and Shannon Russell (a missionary with Jungle Aviation and Radio Service (JAARS), along with her husband).

Education in linguistics 
Everett had some initial success learning the language, but when SIL lost their contract with the Brazilian government, he enrolled in the fall of 1978 at the University of Campinas in Brazil, under the auspices of which he could continue to study Pirahã. Everett focused on the theories of Noam Chomsky. His master's thesis, Aspectos da Fonologia do Pirahã, was written under the direction of Aryon Rodrigues, one of the leading experts on Amazonian languages. It was completed in 1980. His PhD dissertation, A Lingua Pirahã e Teoria da Sintaxe, completed in 1983, was written under the direction of Charlotte Chambelland Galves. This dissertation provided a detailed Chomskyan analysis of Pirahã.

On one of his research missions in 1993, Everett was the first to document the Oro Win language, one of the few languages in the world to use the rare voiceless dental bilabially trilled affricate (phonetically).

Work

Amazonian and other American languages 
Everett has conducted field research on many Amazonian languages, focusing on their phonetics (sound production), phonology (sound structures), morphology (word structures), syntax (sentence structures), discourse structures and content (how people communicate culturally relevant information by stories), pragmatics (how language is constrained by some social settings), ethnolinguistics (how culture affects linguistic forms), historical linguistics (the reconstruction of the origin and dispersion of languages by comparing data from other languages), among other areas. He has published a grammar of the Wari' language (with Barbara Kern), a grammar of Pirahã, and grammar sketches of other languages.

Aspectos da Fonologia do Pirahã 
Everett's 1979 Universidade Estadual de Campinas master's thesis on the sound system of Piraha, from articulatory phonetics to prosody (e.g. intonation, tone, and stress placement).

A Língua Pirahã e a Teoria da Sintaxe 
This was Everett's 1983 Sc.D. dissertation at the Universidade Estadual de Campinas (UNICAMP) and is still the most comprehensive statement of Pirahã grammar available. Everett has revised many of his analyses of the language in the intervening years and is planning a much more comprehensive grammar with detailed discourse studies in the coming years.

Wari': The Pacaas-Novos Language of Western Brazil 
This 540-page grammar of the Wari' language was a ten-year project that was undertaken by Everett and New Tribes Missionary, Barbara Kern, who has worked among the Wari' since 1962 and is perhaps the most fluent non-Wari' speaker of the language.

Universal grammar 
Everett eventually concluded that Chomsky's ideas about universal grammar, and the universality of recursion in particular (at least understood in terms of self-embedded structures), are falsified by Pirahã. His 2005 article in Current Anthropology, entitled "Cultural Constraints on Grammar and Cognition in Pirahã", has caused a controversy in the field of linguistics. Chomsky called Everett a "charlatan", and said that even if Pirahã had all the properties described by Everett, there would be no implications for universal grammar. "Everett hopes that readers will not understand the difference between UG in the technical sense (the theory of the genetic component of human language) and in the informal sense, which concerns properties common to all languages".. The June 2009 issue of the Journal of the Linguistic Society of America, Language, contains a nearly 100-page debate between Everett and some of his principal critics.

Don't Sleep, There Are Snakes: Life and Language in the Amazonian Jungle 
In November 2008, Everett's book on the culture and language of the Pirahã people, and what it was like to live among them, was published in the United Kingdom by Profile Books and in the United States by Pantheon Books. Blackwell's booksellers in the UK selected this as one of the best books of 2009 in the UK. National Public Radio selected it as one of the best books of 2009 in the US. Translations have appeared in German, French, and Korean, and others are due to appear in 2010 in Thai, and Mandarin. Although the book has been discussed widely on the internet for the chapter that discusses his abandonment of religious faith, it is mainly about doing scientific field research and the discoveries that this has led to about the grammar and culture of the Pirahã people. Don't Sleep, There Are Snakes was runner-up for the 2008 award for adult non-fiction from the Society of Midland Authors.

Language: The Cultural Tool 
This book develops an alternative to the view that language is innate. It argues that language is, like the bow and arrow, a tool to solve a common human problem, the need to communicate efficiently and effectively.

Dark Matter of the Mind: The Culturally Articulated Unconscious 
In this book, published by the University of Chicago Press, Everett reviews a great deal of philosophy, anthropology, linguistics, and cognitive science to argue that humans are molded by culture and that the idea of human nature is not a very good fit with the facts. He reiterates and supports Aristotle's claim that the mind is a blank slate and makes the case that the notion of the human self most compatible with the facts is the Buddhist concept of anātman.

How Language Began: The Story of Humanity's Greatest Invention 
In this work, Everett makes the case that Homo erectus invented language nearly two million years ago and that the subsequent species Homo neanderthalensis and Homo sapiens were born into a linguistic world.

Religious beliefs 
Influenced by the Pirahã's concept of truth, Everett's belief in Christianity slowly diminished and he became an atheist. He says that he was having serious doubts by 1982 and had abandoned all faith by 1985. He would not tell anyone about his atheism until the late 1990s; when he finally did, his marriage ended in divorce and two of his three children broke off all contact. However, by 2008 full contact and relations have been restored with his children, who now seem to accept his viewpoint on theism.

Selected publications

Books 
 How Language Began: The Story of Humanity's Greatest Invention (2017) Liveright (W.W. Norton).
 Dark Matter of the Mind: The Culturally Articulated Unconscious (2016) University of Chicago Press.
 Linguistic Fieldwork (2012). Cambridge University Press, Cambridge. Daniel Everett & Jeanette Sakel. 
 Language: The Cultural Tool (2012). Pantheon Books, New York.
 Don't Sleep, There are Snakes: Life and Language in the Amazonian Jungle (2008). Pantheon Books, New York. 
 Wari: The Pacaas Novos Language of Western Brazil (1997). Routledge, London, New York. 
 Why There are No Clitics: An Alternative Perspective on Pronominal Allomorphy (1996). SIL, Dallas, Texas.

Discussed 
In 2016 Tom Wolfe published a book, The Kingdom of Speech, in which he discusses work of four major figures in the history of the sciences of evolution and language, the last of them being Daniel Everett.

References

External links 
 
 "The Grammar of Happiness", a documentary about Everett's life and work.
 "Recursion and human thought: why the Pirahã don't have numbers: A Talk With Daniel L. Everett", Edge.
 "Daniel Everett", University of Pittsburgh University Times.
 Daniel Everett's Machines Like Us interview.
 'Language, Culture, and Being Human', lecture recorded at the London School of Economics, 22 March 2012.
 Interview with Daniel Everett on Keeper of the Snails.
 Interview with Daniel Everett on The Humanist Hour.
 Interview with Daniel Everett on What I've Learned.
 "Monolingual Fieldwork" Demonstration by Daniel Everett

1951 births
Living people
People from Imperial County, California
Linguists from the United States
Academics of the University of Manchester
State University of Campinas alumni
American emigrants to Brazil
American atheists
American former Protestants
American Protestant missionaries
Protestant missionaries in Brazil
Missionary linguists
Linguists of Chapacuran languages
Linguists of Pirahã